Syrmia County was a historic administrative subdivision (županija) of the Kingdom of Croatia-Slavonia. Croatia-Slavonia was an autonomous kingdom within the Lands of the Crown of Saint Stephen (Transleithania), the Hungarian part of Austria-Hungary. The region of Syrmia is today split between Croatia and Serbia. The capital of the county was Vukovar.

Geography
 
Syrmia County shared borders with other Croatian-Slavonian counties of Požega and Virovitica, the Austro-Hungarian land of Bosnia and Herzegovina, the Kingdom of Serbia, and the Hungarian counties of Bács-Bodrog and Torontál. The County stretched along the right (southern) bank of the river Danube and the left (northern) bank of the river Sava, down to their confluence. Its area was 6,866 km² around 1910.

Background

By the 13th century, two counties were formed in this region: Syrmia (in the east) and Vukovar (in the west). Syrmia County was an administrative division of the Kingdom of Hungary in the Middle Ages. This area was taken by the Ottoman Empire in 1521 and the two counties were abolished. The territory was then (in 1544) included into Ottoman Sanjak of Syrmia. The Habsburg monarchy took one part of Syrmia from the Ottomans in 1688, while the other part was taken by Habsburgs in 1718. The entire region was incorporated into the Military Frontier, which was then extended from Western Slavonia, where it stood in 1683, all the way to Transylvania.

History

Syrmia County was re-established in 1745 as part of the Kingdom of Slavonia, a Habsburg province, which was part of both the Habsburg Kingdom of Croatia and the Habsburg Kingdom of Hungary. The Kingdom of Slavonia was mainly inhabited by Serbs and Croats.

In 1848 and 1849, the area of the county was part of the Serbian Voivodship, a Serbian autonomous region proclaimed at the May Assembly in Karlovci. Between 1849 and 1860 the area was part of the Voivodeship of Serbia and Banat of Temeschwar, a separate crown land of the Austrian Empire. During this time the county did not exist since the voivodeship was divided into districts.

After 1860, Syrmia County was established again, and was incorporated into the Kingdom of Slavonia, which was a completely separate Habsburg province at the time.

After World War I, the area of Syrmia County became part of the newly formed Kingdom of Serbs, Croats and Slovenes in 1918 and this was confirmed by the Treaty of Saint-Germain in September 1919. The County of Syrmia was an official administrative division of the Kingdom of Serbs, Croats and Slovenes between 1918 and 1922, and then was transformed into the Province (Oblast) of Syrmia (de facto it was carried out in   1924).

Demographics

According to the census of 1870, the county had 120,352 inhabitants.
According to the census of 1890, the county had 347,022 inhabitants.

In 1900, the county had a population of 381,739 people and was composed of the following linguistic communities:

Total:
 Serbian: 168,982 (44.3%)
 Croatian: 100,360 (26.3%)
 German: 67,027 (17.6%)
 Hungarian: 23,539 (6.2%)
 Slovak: 11,415 (3.0%)
 Ruthenian: 4,345 (1.1%)
 Romanian: 601 (0.2%)
 Other or unknown: 5,470 (1.4%)

According to the census of 1900, the county was composed of the following religious communities:

Total:
 Eastern Orthodox: 172,818 (45.3%)
 Roman Catholic: 171,142 (44.8%)
 Lutheran: 22,473 (5.9%)
 Calvinist: 5,750 (1.5%)
 Greek Catholic: 4,681 (1.2%)
 Jewish: 3,894 (1.0%)
 Unitarian: 2 (0.0%)
 Other or unknown: 979 (0.3%)

In 1910, the county had a population of 414,234 people and was composed of the following linguistic communities:

Total:
 Serbian: 183,109 (44.2%)
 Croatian: 106,198 (25.6%)
 German: 68,086 (16.4%)
 Hungarian: 29,522 (7.1%)
 Slovak: 13,841 (3.3%)
 Ruthenian: 4,642 (1.1%)
 Romanian: 587 (0.1%)
 Other or unknown: 8,249 (2.0%)

According to the census of 1910, the county was composed of the following religious communities:

Total:
 Eastern Orthodox: 189,007 (45.6%)
 Roman Catholic: 182,140 (44.0%)
 Lutheran: 25,927 (6.3%)
 Calvinist: 7,512 (1.8%)
 Greek Catholic: 5,722 (1.4%)
 Jewish: 3,779 (0.9%)
 Unitarian: 7 (0.0%)
 Other or unknown: 140 (0.0%)

Subdivisions

In the early 20th century, the subdivisions of Syrmia county were:

The towns of Vukovar, Ilok, Vinkovci, and Županja are currently in Croatia, in Vukovar-Syrmia county. The towns of Šid, Ruma, Irig, Mitrovica (Sremska Mitrovica), Stara Pazova, Sremski Karlovci and Petrovaradin are currently in Serbia (Vojvodina province). Zemun is currently in Serbian region of Belgrade.

See also

 Palace of Syrmia County
 Kingdom of Slavonia
 Srem District of Vojvodina, Serbia
 Vukovar-Syrmia County of Croatia

References

Literature

 
 
 

 
1924 disestablishments
Former counties of Croatia
Vojvodina under Habsburg rule
Counties in the Kingdom of Hungary
History of Slavonia
History of Syrmia
States and territories established in the 18th century